The  is a tributary of the Arakawa River that mainly runs through the eastern part of Saitama Prefecture.

History
Originally, the river flowed into a wetland at the current region of Minuma. In 1629, a civil engineering project by  created a reservoir and blocked the flow.  In 1727, the reservoir levee was demolished to open up the area for creating rice paddies. In 1728, the lowest sections of the area were gouged to allow for the passage of water, which set the current position of the river.

Water quality
The water quality of the river is poor, since it flows through urban areas.  A report published in 2006 by the Ministry of the Environment indicates levels of dioxins and dioxin-like compounds above the standards set for public waterways. For this reason, recent years saw efforts to clear up the river.

References

Rivers of Saitama Prefecture
Rivers of Japan